Cyriak Petyt (by 1517 – buried 1591), of Boughton under Blean, Kent, was an English politician.

He was a Member (MP) of the Parliament of England for Winchelsea in April 1554 and Chippenham in November 1554.

References

1591 deaths
People from Boughton under Blean
English MPs 1554
English MPs 1554–1555
Year of birth uncertain